The 2021–22 BBL-Pokal was the 55th season of the BBL-Pokal, the domestic cup competition of the Basketball Bundesliga (BBL).

Alba Berlin won their eleventh title by defeating Crailsheim Merlins in the final.

Participants
The sixteen highest placed teams from the 2020–21 Basketball Bundesliga, without the relegated teams and promoted teams, qualified for the tournament.

Standings

Round of 16
The games took place between 2 and 5 October 2021.

Quarterfinals
The draw was held on 5 October 2021. The games took place on 13 and 14 November 2021.

Final four
The draw was held on 14 November 2021. The games will take place on 19 and 20 February 2022 in Berlin.

Bracket

Semifinals

Final

References

External links
Official website

BBL-Pokal seasons